Charbonnages de France was a French enterprise created in 1946, as a result of the nationalization of the private mining companies. It was disbanded in 2007.

References 

Mining companies of France
French companies established in 1946
Non-renewable resource companies established in 1946
Non-renewable resource companies disestablished in 2008
Energy companies established in 1946
French companies disestablished in 2008